Josip Modrić (born 13 August 1979) is a retired Croatian football defender.

References

1979 births
Living people
Association football defenders
Croatian footballers
HNK Rijeka players
NK Zadar players
Croatian Football League players
First Football League (Croatia) players